Odontophrynus lavillai (Spanish name: escuericito) is a species of frog in the family Odontophrynidae. It is found in northern Argentina, western and northern Paraguay, central-western Brazil (Mato Grosso do Sul), and eastern Bolivia.

Odontophrynus lavillai is a fossorial frog. It occurs in open habitats from the Chaco to the Interandean Valles. Reproduction takes place in temporary waterbodies, including roadside ditches. It is locally threatened by habitat loss.

References

lavillai
Amphibians of Argentina
Amphibians of Bolivia
Amphibians of Brazil
Amphibians of Paraguay
Taxonomy articles created by Polbot
Amphibians described in 1985
Taxa named by José Miguel Alfredo María Cei